In the NUTS (Nomenclature of Territorial Units for Statistics) codes of France (FR), the three levels are:

History
Up until 2016, the first level NUTS regions of France consisted of Ile de France, Bassin Parisien, Nord-Pas-de-Calais, Est, Ouest, Sud-Ouest, Centre-Est,
Mediterranee and the Departement d'Outre Mer. The Departement d'Outre Mer consisted of all the overseas departments of France, while the remaining eight statistical regions were made up of the 22 regions of France.

A law passed in 2014 by the French parliament reduced the number of metropolitan regions in the country from 22 to 13. The decrease took effect from 1 January 2016. As a result of these changes in the regions of France, the first level NUTS statistical regions were altered to reflect the changes. The number of first level regions was increased to 14 so that each of the 13 metropolitan regions of France became a separate first level statistical region.

Départements d'outre mer

Although the Départements d'outre mer, as integrated departments of France, have always been a part of the European Union and its predecessors, they were only officially included as a permanent NUTS statistical area of France in 1989. When they did appear in previous statistics the first and second level NUTS areas where one and the same, from 1989, Guadeloupe, Martinique, French Guiana and La Réunion were designated as separate level 2 regions.

NUTS codes

Local administrative units

Below the NUTS levels, the two LAU (Local Administrative Units) levels are:

The LAU codes of France can be downloaded here: See also
 Subdivisions of France
 ISO 3166-2 codes of France
 FIPS region codes of France

Notes

References

Sources
 FRANC - NUTS level 1 to 3 (Commission Regulation (EU) 2016/2066, 21 November 2016), Official Journal of the European Union, pdf, page 26
 List of current NUTS codes (2016) with previously used codes, simap.ted.europa.eu History of NUTS, ec.europa.eu/eurostat Overview map of EU Countries - NUTS level 1 (2010) Correspondence between the NUTS levels and the national administrative units (2016), ec.europa.eu/eurostat''

France
Nuts